Matebeleng, also known as Matebele(Ndebele) is a village in Kgatleng District of Botswana. It is located around 20 km north-east of Gaborone and the population was 1,180 in 2001 census.

References

Kgatleng District
Villages in Botswana